Piroshky Piroshky is a Russian bakery based in Seattle, in the U.S. state of Washington.

Description

The menu includes savory and sweet piroshki (beef and cheese, chicken pot pie), cinnamon cardamom braids, frozen pierogis, pelmeni, borscht, and other pastries.

History
The bakery was established in Pike Place Market in 1992, by Vladimir and Zina Kotelnikov. A few years later, son Oliver took over with Olga Sagan. Sagan became sole owner in 2018.

Between 2014 and 2017, Sagan and Oliver Kotelnikov opened three locations (Northgate, Southcenter and Columbia Center.)  There are four locations in Seattle, as of 2022.

The Pike Place Market location appeared on Anthony Bourdain's No Reservations in 2007 and Andrew Zimmern's The Zimmern List in 2017.

By 2018, Piroshky Piroshky had opened its fifth location in Seattle and planned to launch a food truck. The bakery began offering four new vegan options in 2019. 

The Century Square location closed for over a year during the COVID-19 pandemic, but reopened in September 2021. Owner Olga Sagan announced in February 2022 that the location would be closed temporarily closed, citing an increase in violent crime near the store on 3rd Avenue.

Reception
Marina Koren included Piroshky Piroshky in Smithsonian magazine's 2013 list of "The 20 Most Iconic Food Destinations Across America".

See also
 List of bakeries
 List of restaurants in Seattle
 List of Russian restaurants

References

External links

 
 Piroshy Piroshky at PikePlaceMarket.org
 Piroshky Piroshky at Seattle Metropolitan

1992 establishments in Washington (state)
Asian restaurants in Seattle
Bakeries of Washington (state)
Eastern European culture
European-American cuisine
European American culture in Washington (state)
Pike Place Market
Restaurants established in 1992
Russian restaurants in the United States
Russian-American culture
Central Waterfront, Seattle